Sisaala (Sissala) is a Gur language cluster spoken in northern Ghana near the town of Tumu and in the neighbouring republic of Burkina Faso. Western Sisaala is intermediate between Sisaali and Tumulung Sisaala.

Paasaal is similar and also called (Southern) Sisaala.

Distribution
Sisaala is spoken by the Sissala. The Sisaala in Ghana live in the Northern Region, in the Upper East Region and in the Upper West Region.

Burkina Faso’s Sissili Province is named after the Sissala people.

Dialects
Tumulung Sisaala, which is also known as Eastern Sisaala, is spoken East of Tumu in the Upper West region and Builsa in the Upper East Region. Its name derives from the city of Tumu, which is the traditional capital of the Sisaala people.

Western Sisaala, which is also known as Lambishi Sisaala, is spoken in Tumu in the upper west Region and Gonja in the Northern Region.

Paasaal, which is also known as Pasaale/Southern Sisaala, is spoken between Lambussie and Tumu in the Upper West Region.

Burkina Sisaala, which is also known as Sisaali or Northern Sisaala, is spoken in the Burkinabe Provinces of Sissili and Ioba.

References

 Sisaala–English English–Sisaala Dictionary (1975). Ghana Institute of Linguistics, 231 pp. . [Western Sisaala]

External links
 A grammatical sketch of Isaalo (Western Sisaala)

Languages of Ghana
Gurunsi languages